is a former Japanese rugby union player who played as a centre. He spent his whole career playing for both Kintetsu Liners and Toyota Industries Shuttles in Japan's domestic Top League, playing over 560 times. He was named in the Japan squad for the 2007 Rugby World Cup, making 3 appearances in the tournament. He made a further 30 appearances for Japan in his career, scoring 71 points.

References

External links
itsrugby.co.uk profile

1978 births
Living people
People from Osaka Prefecture
Sportspeople from Osaka Prefecture
Japanese rugby union players
Rugby union centres
Hanazono Kintetsu Liners players
Toyota Industries Shuttles Aichi players